Alexander Robertson may refer to:
Alexander Robertson (artist) (1772–1841), Scottish-American artist and co-founder of Columbian Academy of Painting
Alexander Robertson (Canadian politician) (1838–1888), lawyer and politician from Ontario, Canada
Alexander Rocke Robertson (1841–1881), Canadian politician
Alexander Black Robertson (1847–1920), politician from Ontario, Canada
Alexander D. Robertson (1849–1921), politician from Prince Edward Island, Canada
Eck Robertson (Alexander Robertson, 1887–1975), American fiddle player
Alex Robertson (Scottish footballer) (fl. 1902–1903), Scottish footballer
Alex Robertson (Australian rules footballer) (1887–1915), Australian rules footballer for University
Sir Alexander Robertson (police officer) (1896–1970), British police officer, Deputy Commissioner of Police of the Metropolis, 1958–1961
Alexander Robertson (MP) (1779–1856), British Member of Parliament for Grampound
Alexander Robertson (chemist) (1896–1970), British chemist
Alexander Robertson (rugby union) (1848–1913), Scottish rugby union player
Alexander George Morison Robertson (1867–1947), Chief Justice of the Supreme Court of Hawaii
Alexander Robertson, the name of several chiefs of Clan Donnachaidh
Alexander Robertson & Sons, British boat building company
Sir Alexander Robertson (veterinary surgeon) (1908–1990), Scottish veterinarian
Alexander Provan Robertson (1925–1995), Scottish mathematician
Alexander Cunningham Robertson (1816–1884), British general and amateur poet
Alexander Robertson (New York politician) (1825–1902), American businessman and politician from New York
Alexander Robertson (footballer, born 2003), English/Scottish/Australian footballer

See also
Sandy Robertson (disambiguation)